Huizhou Olympic Stadium  is a multi-purpose stadium in Huizhou City, Guangdong Province, China, that opened in 2010.

The stadium holds 40,000 spectators.  It is currently used mostly for football matches. It served as the home stadium for Shenzhen Ruby of the Chinese Super League in the 2011 league season. It also served as the home stadium for the Guangdong football team in the 2012, 2013, 2014 and 2015 Guangdong–Hong Kong Cup.

References

Football venues in China
Multi-purpose stadiums in China
Sports venues in Guangdong
2010 establishments in China
Sports venues completed in 2010